Black Skies in Broad Daylight is the first full-length album by American punk rock band Living Things. It was released by DreamWorks Records on May 3, 2004 in the UK, and on August 17, 2004 in the US. It was produced by Steve Albini. CMJ described the voice of the band's lead singer, Lillian Berlin, as a "snarling Iggy-inspired baritone" and the album's songs as "scathing socio-political commentaries."

Track listing
 Bombs Below
 March In Daylight
 End Gospel
 New Year
 No New Jesus
 I Owe
 Born Under The Gun
 On All Fours
 Keep It Till You Fold
 Dead Deer
 Standard Oil Trust
 For Tomorrow We Die I Wish The Best For You
 Body Worship

Personnel
 Steve Albini – engineer
 Bosh Berlin – drums
 Eve Berlin – bass
 Lillian Berlin  – guitar, vocals
 Bryn Bridenthal – publicity
 Mike Dewdney – booking
 Ben Grosse – mixing
 Beth Halper – A&R
 Lij –  engineer, mixing, producer
 Jennifer Ross – coordination
 Floria Sigismondi – creative director, photography

References

Living Things (band) albums
2004 debut albums
DreamWorks Records albums
Albums produced by Steve Albini